Sulley may refer to:

Entertainment
James P. "Sulley" Sullivan, one of the main protagonists of the 2001 film Monsters, Inc.
"Sulley", a song from the film soundtrack of the film Monsters University

People
Sulley Muntari, a Ghanaian soccer player
Susan Ann Sulley, British pop singer

See also
Sully (disambiguation)
Sulli (disambiguation)